Prince Marco of Hohenlohe-Langenburg, 19th Duke of Medinaceli, GE (8 March 1962 – 19 August 2016), was a German-Spanish nobleman who was head of the ducal house of Medinaceli and a dynast of the princely house of Hohenlohe-Langenburg.

Life and family 

Prince Marco was born in Madrid, Spain, on 8 March 1962. He was the eldest son of Prince Max of Hohenlohe-Langenburg by his then wife Ana Luisa de Medina y Fernández de Córdoba, 12th Marquise of Navahermosa and 10th Countess of Ofalia (1940−2012), who was the eldest child of Victoria Eugenia Fernández de Córdoba, 18th Duchess of Medinaceli (1917–2013).

Prince Marco's mother, the previous heiress to the dukedom of Medinaceli, predeceased her mother in 2012. He succeeded as duke when his grandmother, the 18th Duchess of Medinaceli, died in 2013. He preserved his family's cultural heritage as director of the Fundación Medinaceli.

In 1996, he married a German citizen, Sandra Schmidt-Polex, by whom he had two children:
 Princess Victoria Elisabeth of Hohenlohe-Langenburg, 20th Duchess of Medinaceli (b. Málaga, 17 March 1997)
 Prince Alexander Gonzalo of Hohenlohe-Langenburg, 14th Duke of Ciudad Real, 13th Marquess of Navahermosa (b. Málaga, 9 March 1999)

They divorced in 2004.

See also 
 Spanish nobility
 Mediatized Houses

References

External links 

1962 births
2016 deaths
Dukes of Medinaceli
Dukes of Spain
Grandees of Spain
Marco
Marco
Nobility from Madrid
Marco
Spanish people of German descent
Spanish people of Mexican descent